The Holy Rosary Academy is a Catholic school in Hinunangan, Philippines, founded in 1948, educating primary and secondary students.

History
The Holy Rosary Academy was founded in 1948 by Manuel Mascariñas, D.D., the bishop of Palo, assisted by Fr. Gregorio M. Florendo, the parish priest of Hinunangan, in response to the request of some Catholics of the town. The school teaches its curriculum in English.

The large parish convent was utilized as the initial school building. Several buildings and facilities were later added to meet the requirements of its students and the Bureau of Private Schools. There were setbacks including financial shortages and natural calamities.

The school originally offered only a first to third year academic secondary course. There were two school years, 1950–52, in which it offered a complete secondary course plus a first year of Junior Normal College. But after the school year 1951-52, only a complete secondary course with vocational subjects was offered.

With later increase of enrolment, the school buildings became insufficient; in 1968, when  Fr. Frederick Wakeham, SFM was in place, a new building was constructed where the old one stood, using funds collected locally and abroad.

Departments
 Pre-Elementary
 Nursery
 Kindergarten
 Preparatory
 Elementary
 High School

References
 Student Handbook

Catholic elementary schools in the Philippines
Schools in Southern Leyte